Legenda Aurea is a heavy metal band from Zürich, Switzerland, where they were formed in 2005, while they play a style of gothic metal, power metal, and symphonic metal music.

Background
They formed during 2005 in Zürich, Switzerland, where they are vocalist, Simone Christinat, guitarist, Odilo "Odi" von Ins, bassist, Herki, keyboardist, Renato Trinkler, and drummer, Philipp Eichenberger. Their former vocalist was Claudia Hofer, while their founding drummer was Martin Roth, and one of their past guitarist was Michael Herkenrath.

Music history
The group have released three albums. Their first studio album, Sedna, was released on 26 January 2007, by Mindstorm Records. They released, Ellipsis, on 6 March 2009, with Twilight Zone Records. The third studio album, Aeon, was released independently on 12 February 2016.

Members
Current
 Simone - vocals
 Odilo - guitar
 Herki - bass
 Renato - keys
 Philipp - drums
Former
 Claudia Hofer - vocals
 Martin Roth - drums
 Michael Herkenrath - bass

Discography
 Sedna (26 January 2007, Mindstorm)
 Ellipsis (6 March 2009, Twilight Zone)
 Aeon (12 February 2016, independent)

References

Swiss heavy metal musical groups
Musical groups established in 2005
2005 establishments in Switzerland
Power metal musical groups
Gothic metal musical groups
Swiss symphonic metal musical groups